High Hopes is the eighteenth studio album by American recording artist Bruce Springsteen, released January 14, 2014, on Columbia Records. It went to the top of the charts in eleven countries, and was Springsteen's eleventh No. 1 album in the United States, a record surpassed only by the Beatles and Jay-Z. It was his tenth No. 1 in the UK putting him on par with the Rolling Stones and U2. Rolling Stone named it the second-best album of 2014.

The album is a collection of cover songs, out-takes and re-imagined versions of tracks from past albums, EPs and tours. 
Springsteen's regular backing band, the E Street Band, perform along with guitarist Tom Morello. Contributions from deceased members Clarence Clemons and Danny Federici also feature.

Background
Springsteen said that the new music was "some of our best unreleased material from the past decade" and among his best writing and deserved a proper studio recording. Work on the album started on December 9, 2012, when Springsteen called Aniello to discuss some unfinished demos of older songs. Aniello began production on the album in Los Angeles while the band continued the Wrecking Ball Tour. Aniello said that Springsteen "was gone most of the time, so we weren't able to sit in a room and sort it all out" and that it "took the most part of a year for him to figure it out". In March 2013, the day before Springsteen flew to Australia to resume touring, he went to Los Angeles, where he and Aniello did mixes, and Springsteen posed for the album pictures. Springsteen was "working his ass off, just working his ass off", Aniello recalled. "I've never seen someone his age work like that. He put in a 15-hour day in the studio." While in Australia, with Steven Van Zandt—who was off filming Lilyhammer—having been replaced by Tom Morello, the band spent its off time recording new music, with no specific plans for a new album. Aniello said recording in Australia was a spontaneous decision that was possible because recording engineer Nick DiDia was there to work with the band. More recording took place at various studios around the US, including Springsteen's personal home studio in New Jersey, Atlanta, New York City and Nashville. While many critics found that the album lacked the cohesion typical of Springsteen's releases, Aniello insisted that Springsteen went "back and forth with sequences for months and months until he [got] it exactly where he [wanted] it." "We recorded a lot and at first it was a much longer record. Bruce did the same thing with Wrecking Ball", he recalled.

Songs
High Hopes was Springsteen's first studio album composed entirely of covers, outtakes and reimagined versions of songs from past albums and tours. "The best way to describe this record," Springsteen said, "is that's it's a bit of an anomaly but not much. I don't really work linearly like a lot of people do." The title track was the album's first single, and was originally recorded in 1995 and released on the Blood Brothers EP the following year. According to Springsteen, Morello suggested they perform the song during the Wrecking Ball Tour, which ultimately led to it being re-recorded. "American Skin (41 Shots)" was originally written in 2000 in response to the death of Amadou Diallo. A live version was released on Live in New York City while the studio version was released on a rare promo CD. During the Wrecking Ball Tour, Springsteen started to perform the song again as a tribute to Trayvon Martin. "The Ghost of Tom Joad" was the first single from the 1995 album of the same name and had been performed many times, often featuring Morello on guitar and trading vocals with Springsteen. The track had also been covered by Morello's former band, Rage Against the Machine, in a 1997 video, and later appeared on their album Renegades.

"Harry's Place" was written in 2001 for The Rising; "Heaven's Wall", "Down in the Hole" and "Hunter of Invisible Game" date from 2002 to 2008. Springsteen wrote "The Wall" around 1998 based on an idea from Joe Grushecky. It tells the story of Springsteen's visit to the Vietnam Veterans Memorial in Washington, D.C., and memories of Walter Cichon, a New Jersey musician who did not return home from the war. "Walter was one of the great early Jersey Shore rockers, who along with his brother Ray (one of my early guitar mentors) led the Motifs. The Motifs were a local rock band who were always a head above everybody else. Raw, sexy and rebellious, they were the heroes you aspired to be", Springsteen explained. Morello also suggested two covers. "Just Like Fire Would", by Australian punk rock band The Saints, and "Dream Baby Dream" by protopunk band Suicide. A version of the latter was released in September 2013 as a music video tribute to the fans who attended the Wrecking Ball Tour. In 2005, Springsteen closed out shows on his solo Devils & Dust Tour performing the song on a pump organ.

"Cold Spot", "Hey, Blue Eyes", "American Beauty" and "Mary, Mary" were among the 20 songs recorded that did not make the final cut, some of which were released on the American Beauty EP.

Release and promotion
The album was preceded by the single "High Hopes". A music video for "Just Like Fire Would" was released January 22, 2014. A music video for "The Wall" was aired during the 2014 HBO special, Bruce Springsteen's High Hopes. On July 9, 2014, Springsteen released a short film for "Hunter of Invisible Game" which marked his directorial debut. In April 2014, Springsteen released American Beauty, a four-track EP of songs that did not make the final cut of High Hopes.

On December 28, 2013, Amazon.com made the album available for purchase as individual MP3 files through their mobile application. Amazon quickly removed the files, but it was too late and the album leaked by mid-day.

On January 12, 2014, the television series The Good Wife featured snippets of three songs ("High Hopes", "Hunter of Invisible Game" and "The Ghost of Tom Joad") during the episode. Usage of Springsteen's songs was part of a deal between his label and the CBS television network to gain wider exposure for the album in an unconventional way and lure his baby boomer fans to the show and the network's website. Springsteen said, "This is music I always felt needed to be released. I felt they all deserved a home and a hearing" in a statement discussing the CBS deal.

On January 14, 2014, the entire episode of Late Night with Jimmy Fallon was dedicated to Springsteen. Springsteen and the E Street Band, with Tom Morello but without Steven Van Zandt (who was filming Lilyhammer), performed "High Hopes", "Heaven's Wall" and "Just Like Fire Would". The latter song was streamed online and was not shown on television. Springsteen and Fallon, both dressed as Springsteen from the Born in the U.S.A. era, performed a parody song to the theme of "Born to Run" titled "Gov. Christie Traffic Jam", poking fun at the Fort Lee lane closure scandal. Springsteen was also interviewed.

On April 4, 2014, HBO aired Bruce Springsteen's High Hopes, a 30-minute documentary on the making of High Hopes. In May 2014, Sony Music Netherlands released a 45-minute documentary to YouTube titled High Hopes In South Africa which documented Springsteen and the E Street Band's first-ever concerts in South Africa.

Critical reception

High Hopes got a mixed reception from critics, with Metacritic giving it 67 / 100, based upon 37 reviews, a "generally favorable" response. Stephen Thomas Erlewine of AllMusic wrote that "it's rather thrilling to hear Springsteen revel in a mess of contradictions", as the "songs don't cohere into a mood or narrative", a contrast to Springsteen's "two decades of deliberate, purposeful albums". At Rolling Stone, David Fricke found that the "cumulative effect of this mass of old, borrowed, blue...is retrospect with a cutting edge". For Kyle Anderson of Entertainment Weekly it "crackles with immediacy, despite the cobbled-together nature of the material." At The Independent, Andy Gill also noted the lack of "thematic unity" but lauded how "Tom Morello has re-invigorated old material".

A rave review in NME proclaimed, "Still The Boss". Greg Kot of the Chicago Tribune noted "the singer's desire to update his sound", and praised "Just Like Fire Would", "Hunter of Invisible Game", and "The Wall", but described the album as "otherwise ho-hum". At The A.V. Club, David Anthony said that "Springsteen splashes his brightest colors against a canvas, crosses his fingers, and hopes they mesh." Jessica Hopper of Spin said that "the small tragedy of the uneven High Hopes [is] that it doesn't play like a Springsteen album." At Pitchfork, Stephen M. Deusner noted that "the thick arrangements distract from the good songwriting and conceal the bad".

PopMatters concluded that there "isn’t a lack of strong songs — there are plenty here. Rather, it’s the unusual surfeit of so-so songs that undercuts the album" which "lacks a sorely missed sense of scope and unity".

Jesse Cataldo of Slant Magazine saw Springsteen "[aligning] himself with a long tradition of folksingers" in tuning into "the deeper inequalities that inspire" the songs. At The Guardian, Ian Gittins saw the album as a stopgap, but "one assembled with tender, loving care." USA Todays Edna Gundersen's review ran under the headline, "Grab-bag material could hurt Springsteen's 'High Hopes'". It quoted Billboard magazine's Keith Caulfield who said, "Wrecking Ball did 196,000 its first week. It's safe to say this won't do that. But anything Bruce puts out sells respectably." Gundersen also reported Caulfield saying, of Springsteen's decision to allow his music to be used for The Good Wife, "He's doing what everyone's doing, reaching consumers that are going to buy their music."

In December 2014, Rolling Stone named High Hopes the second best album (behind only U2's Songs of Innocence) on their Top 50 Albums of 2014 list.

Commercial performance
The album debuted at No. 1 on the Billboard 200 album chart on its first week of release, Springsteen's eleventh No. 1 and placing him third on the acts with the most No.1's behind the Beatles (with 19 No. 1s) and Jay-Z (with 13). The album sold around 99,000 copies in the US in its first week, and as of October 2015 had sold 213,000. The album also debuted at No. 1 in the UK, his tenth time to top that chart.

Track listing

Notes
 The album was also released on 180-gram vinyl as a double LP. The CD version of the album also came packaged with the LP.
 The deluxe version of the album included a limited edition DVD titled Born in the U.S.A. Live: London 2013, featuring the band performing the entire Born in the U.S.A. album in London, England, during the Wrecking Ball World Tour.

Personnel
Adapted from the album's liner notes:

Bruce Springsteen – lead vocals , guitar , mandolin , banjo , additional bass guitar , drums , vibraphone , percussion , percussion loop , synthesizers , organ , piano , harmonium 
Roy Bittan – piano , organ 
Clarence Clemons – tenor saxophone 
Danny Federici – organ 
Nils Lofgren – guitar , pedal steel , mandolin , backing vocals 
Patti Scialfa – backing vocals 
Garry Tallent – bass guitar 
Steven Van Zandt – guitar , backing vocals 
Max Weinberg – drums , percussion 
Tom Morello – guitar , lead guitar , lead vocals , backing vocals 
Charles Giordano – organ , accordion 
Ron Aniello – guitar , 12-string guitar , bass guitar , drum loop , vibraphone , percussion , percussion loop , synthesizers , organ , farfisa organ , accordion ,
Soozie Tyrell – violin , additional violin , backing vocals 
Sam Bardfeld – violin 
 Jake Clemons – tenor saxophone solo , horns 
Barry Danielian – horns 
Clark Gayton – horns 
Stan Harrison – horns 
 Ed Manion – horns 
Curt Ramm – horns , cornet 
Scott Tibbs – horn orchestration 
Jeff Kievit – piccolo trumpet 
Cillian Vallely – uilleann pipes, low whistle, tin whistle 
Josh Freese – drums 
 Everett Bradley –  percussion , backing vocals 
 Curtis King – backing vocals 
 Cindy Mizelle – backing vocals 
 Michelle Moore – backing vocals 
 Evan Springsteen – backing vocals 
 Jessica Springsteen – backing vocals 
 Samuel Springsteen – backing vocals 
Tawatha Agee – backing vocals 
Keith Fluitt – backing vocals 
John James – backing vocals 
Al Thornton – backing vocals 
Brenda White – backing vocals 
Atlanta Strings :
Ed Horst – string arrangement, conductor
Justin Bruns, Jay Christy, Sheela Iyengar, John Meisner, Christopher Pulgram, William Pu, Olga Shpitko, Kenn Wagner – violins
Amy Chang, Tania Maxwell, Lachlan McBane – violas
Karen Freer, Charae Krueger, Daniel Laufer – celli
NY Chamber Consort Strings :
Rob Mathes – string arrangement, conductor
Lisa Kim (concertmaster), Quan Ge, Hyunju Lee, Jessica Lee, Ann Lehman, Joanna Mauer, Suzanne Ornstein, Annaliesa Place, David Southorn, Jeannie Wynton, Sharon Yamada – violins
Maurycy Banaszek, Desiree Elsevier, Shmuel Katz, Robert Rinehart – violas
Maria Kitsopoulos, Alan Stepansky, Ru Pei Yeh – celli

Technical

 Ron Aniello, Bruce Springsteen – production , co-production 
 Brendan O'Brien – production 
 Ross Petersen, Toby Scott, Nick DiDia – recording engineering
 Rob Lebret, Kevin Mills, Geoff Sanoff, Bob Clearmountain, Dave Schiffman – additional recording
 Bob Clearmountain – mixing
 Brandon Duncan, Sergio Ruelas Jr., Chris Lord-Alge – assistants 
 Nik Karpen, Keith Armstrong, Brad Townsend, Andrew Schubert – assistants 
 Brendan O'Brien – mixing 
 Tom Syrowski, Karl Egsieker, Tom Tapley – assistants
 Bob Ludwig – mastering
 Karl Egsieker, Tom Tapley, Brendan Dekora, Alex Williams, Sean Astill, Tom Astill, Jordan Power, Jack Prest, Luke Yeoman, Daniel Zaidenstadt, Benjamin Rice, Phil Joly, John Horne, Joe Viscano, Mike Bauer, Ted Tuthill, Owen Mulholland – engineering assistants
 Kyle Hoffman, Brandon Duncan – assistants
 Billy Bowers – Pro Tools
 Toby Scott – production coordination
 Shari Sutcliffe – musician contractor
 Sandra Park, Patricia Horst – strings contractor
 Kevin Buell – guitars and technical services
 Michelle Holme – art direction, design
 Danny Clinch – photography
 Edward Smith, Nyra Lang – assistants

Charts

Weekly charts

Year-end charts

Certifications

References

External links
 

Bruce Springsteen albums
2014 albums
Albums produced by Brendan O'Brien (record producer)
Albums produced by Ron Aniello
Columbia Records albums